The China Construction Bank Corporation Macau Branch is a bank in Macau, China. It was wholly owned by China Construction Bank (Asia) , a wholly owned subsidiary of China Construction Bank, and renamed from China Construction Bank (Macau) Corporation Limited) after its incorporation with China Construction Bank in June 2014.  It now has 8 subbranches in Macau offering retail banking products and services, a Commercial Banking Division and a China Enterprise Division offering commercial banking products and services. It was originated from the Bank of Canton (Macau Branch) which was established in 1936.

History
1912: Bank of Canton was established in Hong Kong.
1936: Bank of Canton (Macau Branch) was established in Macau.
1945: Bank of Canton was re-established after it was seriously disrupted during the Great Depression in 1930s and the World War II in 1940s.
1988: Bank of Canton was acquired by Security Pacific National Bank and renamed to "Security Pacific Asian Bank".
1992: Security Pacific Corporation was merged with Bank of America.
1993: Security Pacific Asian Bank was renamed to "Bank of America (Asia)".
2006: China Construction Bank acquired Bank of America (Asia) from Bank of America.
2007: Bank of America (Asia) was renamed to China Construction Bank (Asia). Bank of America (Macau) was also renamed to China Construction Bank (Macau).
2014: China Construction Bank (Macau) Corporation Limited was incorporated with China Construction Bank Corporation and renamed to China Construction Bank Corporation Macau Branch.

See also

China Construction Bank
China Construction Bank (Asia)

External links
China Construction Bank (Macau)

References

Banks of Macau
China Construction Bank
Banks established in 1936
1936 establishments in Macau